The 2005–06 Macedonian Football Cup was the 14th season of Macedonia's football knockout competition. FK Bashkimi were the defending champions, having won their first title. The 2005–06 champions were FK Makedonija Gjorche Petrov who won their first title as well.

Competition calendar

First round
Matches were played on 31 July 2005.

|colspan="3" style="background-color:#97DEFF" align=center|31 July 2005

|}

Second round
The first legs were played on 14 September and second were played on 19 October 2005.

|}

Quarter-finals
The first legs were played on 2 November and second were played on 30 November 2005.

|}

Semi-finals
The first legs were played on 5 April and the second on 10 May 2006.

Summary

|}

Matches

Shkëndija 79 won 2–1 on aggregate.

Makedonija GP won 3–2 on aggregate.

Final

See also
2005–06 Macedonian First Football League
2005–06 Macedonian Second Football League

External links
 2005–06 Macedonian Football Cup at rsssf.org
 2005–06 Macedonian Football Cup at FFM.mk

Macedonia
Cup
Macedonian Football Cup seasons